Robert Rylands' Last Journey is a Spanish-British film directed by Gracia Querejeta that premiered on 18 October 1996. It was the director's second feature film. Her script is a loose adaptation of the novel  by Javier Marías, which the novelist repudiated. The subsequent controversy ended with a lawsuit, which resulted in an indemnification towards the writer and an order to withdraw his name from the credits of the film.

Plot
Robert Rylands, a seductive archaeologist and university professor aged 60, voluntarily presents himself to testify at the police station. His story to the deputy, which lasts all night, begins with the arrival in Oxford of Juan Noguera, a young teacher who is going to teach a Spanish literature course at the university. Juan stays at the home of his colleague and friend Alfred Cromer, who lives with his sister and her little daughter.

Juan soon perceives that the recent return of Robert Rylands to the city, after an absence of ten years, disturbs the family. He tries to investigate the cause, but both Alfred and Jill refuse to reveal the secret between them. Meanwhile, Alfred falls ill and is diagnosed with terminal cancer. Rylands tries repeatedly to contact Alfred, but he refuses to see him.

Little by little Juan and Jill begin to fall in love. In the end Juan discovers the cause of the resentment against Robert Rylands. Robert and Alfred were lovers, and Jill interposed by going to bed with Robert one day. Jill became pregnant with his daughter, and when Alfred found out, the relationship between the two men broke up, and then Robert embarked on one of his exploration trips with no return date.

Alfred leaves the hospital in a wheelchair, and soon after, Juan collaborates in a plot to meet Robert. After the reproaches of the reunion are reconciled, Robert tells him that he wants them to live together for the time that he has left, but Alfred tells him that if he really loves him, he has to help him die with dignity. Robert finally agrees, and after shooting him with his old gun, he goes to the police station to confess.

Cast
Ben Cross as Alfred Cromer
William Franklyn as Robert Rylands
Gary Piquer as Juan Noguera
Cathy Underwood as Jill, Alfred's sister
Perdita Weeks as Sue, Jill's daughter
Kenneth Colley as Archdale
Lalita Ahmed as Ahira, Robert's housekeeper
Karl Collins as Abraham, Juan's student
Maurice Denham as Hume

Awards and nominations
 1996: Winner of the Círculo de Escritores Cinematográficos Medal for Best Picture, Best Director (Gracia Querejeta), Best Cinematography (Antonio Pueche), Best Editing (Nacho Ruiz Capillas)
 1996: Nominated for the Golden Shell of the San Sebastián Film Festival
 1996: Nominated for the Goya Award for Best Original Music

References

External links
 

1996 drama films
1996 films
British LGBT-related films
Spanish LGBT-related films
English-language Spanish films
Films directed by Gracia Querejeta
1990s English-language films
1990s British films